The 2019–20 EuroLeague Women was the 62nd edition of the European women's club basketball championship organized by FIBA, and the 24th edition since being rebranded as the EuroLeague Women. The season was ended prematurely due to the COVID-19 pandemic.

On 16 June 2020, FIBA Europe announced the season was declared void and would not be finished due to the COVID-19 pandemic.

Team allocation
A total of 19 teams from 11 countries will participate in the 2019–20 EuroLeague Women.

Teams
League positions of the previous season shown in parentheses (TH: EuroLeague Women title holders):

Round and draw dates

Schedule

Draw
The draw was held on 23 July 2019 in Munich, Germany. The 16 teams were drawn into two groups of eight. For the draw, the teams were seeded into eight seeds.

Qualifying round

|}

Regular season

The four top teams of each group will qualify to the quarterfinals.

If teams are level on record at the end of the Regular Season, tiebreakers are applied in the following order:
 Head-to-head record
 Head-to-head point differential
 Head-to-head points scored
 Point differential for the entire regular season
 Points scored for the entire regular season

Group A

Group B

Quarterfinals

|}

First leg

Awards

EuroLeague MVP
 Alina Iagupova ( Fenerbahçe Öznur Kablo)

All-EuroLeague Teams

Coach of the Year
  Víctor Lapeña ( Fenerbahçe Öznur Kablo)

Defensive Player of the Year
  Alyssa Thomas ( ZVVZ USK Praha)

Young Player of the Year
  Iliana Rupert ( Tango Bourges Basket)

MVP of the Week
Regular season

References

External links
 

2019–20 in European women's basketball leagues
EuroLeague Women seasons
Euroleague Women